Taketora (written: 武虎 or 竹虎) is a masculine Japanese given name. Notable people with the name include:

 (1888–1956), Japanese journalist and politician
 (born 1958), Japanese sumo wrestler
 (born 1974), japanese voice actor

Fictional characters 

 Taketora Yamamoto (山本猛虎), a character from the manga and anime Haikyu!! with the position of wing spiker from Nekoma High

Japanese masculine given names